John Thomas McCormack (born 22 July 1965) is a Scottish former footballer who played for Falkirk, Meadowbank Thistle, Stirling Albion, Alloa Athletic and Dumbarton.

References

1965 births
Scottish footballers
Dumbarton F.C. players
Falkirk F.C. players
Stirling Albion F.C. players
Livingston F.C. players
Alloa Athletic F.C. players
Scottish Football League players
Living people
Association football midfielders
Association football defenders